Olympiacos Men's Volleyball, commonly referred to as Olympiacos, Olympiacos Piraeus or with its full name as Olympiacos CFP,  is the men's volleyball department of the major Greek multi-sport club, Olympiacos CFP, based in Piraeus, Attica. The department was founded in 1926 and their home ground is the Melina Merkouri Indoor Hall in Agios Ioannis Rentis, Piraeus.

Olympiacos is the most successful club in Greek volleyball history, having won 30 Greek Volley League titles, 16 Cups, 6 League Cups, all national records, and 2 Super Cups. They are the only volleyball club in Greece to have won a European title, having actually won 3 European titles,  2 CEV Cups in 1996 and 2005 and 1 CEV Challenge Cup in 2023. Olympiacos is a traditional powerhouse in European volleyball, having played in 8 European finals in all three main CEV competitions: 2 times runners-up in the CEV Champions League in 1992 and 2002 (with 7 CEV Champions League final four participations), 2 times winners (1996, 2005) and 2 times runners-up (1997, 1998) in the CEV Cup, one time winners (2023) and one time runners-up (2018) in the CEV Challenge Cup.

Domestically, Olympiacos holds the record for the most consecutive championships won, with eight in a row (1987–1994), and for winning seven championships undefeated (1968, 1974, 1979, 1981, 1988, 1991, 2018). Internationally, their most successful period was between 1992 and 2005, when they came to be included amongst the top volleyball powers in Europe. During this period, apart from their two European trophies, they progressed to eleven final fours in total, seven of them consecutive between 1992 and 1998 (the first four in the CEV Champions League and the next three in the CEV Cup Winners' Cup); they also won a fourth place in the CEV Super Cup and a third in the FIVB Volleyball Men's Club World Championship. Olympiacos came to European prominence again by playing in the 2017–18 CEV Challenge Cup final; at the same time, the women's department won their respective 2017–18 CEV Women's Challenge Cup. In this way, Olympiacos became the first volleyball club that had men and women playing simultaneously in European finals, and one of the very few to have won European trophies in both departments. In 2023, they won the CEV Challenge Cup, beating rivals Panathinaikos in the semi-finals and Maccabi Tel Aviv in the final.

Given the fact that Olympiacos is the most popular sports club in Greece, the men's volleyball department also receives great home support. Apart from some top Greek players such as Marios Giourdas, Giorgos Ntrakovits, Sakis Moustakidis, Vasilis Kournetas, Antonis Tsakiropoulos, Kostas Christofidelis, Mitar Tzourits, Olympiacos has also attracted over the years some foreign world-class players including Ivan Miljković, Lorenzo Bernardi, Jeff Stork, Marcos Milinkovic, Bengt Gustafsson, Raimonds Vilde, Vasa Mijić, Tom Hoff, Goran Vujević, Henk-Jan Held, Osvaldo Hernández, Fabian Drzyzga and Dragan Travica.

Honours

Domestic competitions

 Greek Volley League
 Winners (30) (record): 1968, 1968−69, 1973−74, 1975−76, 1977−78, 1978−79, 1979−80, 1980−81, 1982−83, 1986−87, 1987−88, 1988−89, 1989−90, 1990−91, 1991−92, 1992−93, 1993−94, 1997−98, 1998−99, 1999−00, 2000−01, 2002−03, 2008−09, 2009−10, 2010−11, 2012−13, 2013−14, 2017−18, 2018−19, 2020−21
 Greek Cup
 Winners (16) (record): 1980−81, 1982−83, 1988−89, 1989−90, 1991−92, 1992−93, 1993−94, 1996−97, 1997−98, 1998−99, 2000−01, 2008−09, 2010−11, 2012−13, 2013−14, 2015−16, 2016−17
 Greek League Cup
 Winners (6) (record): 2012−13, 2014−15, 2015−16, 2016−17, 2017−18, 2018−19
 Greek Super Cup
 Winners (2): 2000, 2010
 Double
 Winners (14) (record): 1980−81, 1982−83, 1988−89, 1989−90, 1991−92, 1992−93, 1993−94, 1997−98, 1998−99, 2000−01, 2008−09, 2010−11, 2012−13, 2013−14

European competitions
 CEV Champions League
 Runners-up (2): 1991−92, 2001−02
 3rd place (2): 1992–93, 1994–95  
 4th place (3): 1981–82, 1993–94, 2000–01    
 CEV Cup Winners' Cup / CEV Top Teams Cup / CEV Cup
 Winners (2): 1995−96, 2004−05
 Runners-up (2): 1996−97, 1997−98
 Semifinals (1): 2018–19
 CEV Challenge Cup
 Winners (1): 2022–23
 Runners-up (1): 2017–18
 CEV European Super Cup
 4th place (1): 1996

Worldwide competitions
  FIVB Volleyball Men's Club World Championship:
 3rd place (1): 1992

International record

The road to 3 CEV European titles

The road to 2 CEV Cups victories

1996 CEV Cup Winners' Cup victory

2005 CEV Top Teams Cup victory

The road to the CEV Challenge Cup victory

2023 CEV Challenge Cup victory

Supporters 

Olympiacos fans are renowned for their passionate and fervent support to the team, with the atmosphere at home matches regarded as extremely intense and intimidating to such an extent that is rarely seen in volleyball matches. In the decade of the 1900s and the early 2000s, Olympiacos was among the top powers in European volleyball (7 consecutive European Final Four participations, four in the CEV Champions League –1992, 1993, 1994, 1995– and three in the CEV Cup Winners' Cup –1996, 1997, 1998–, winners of the 1996 CEV Cup Winners' Cup, twice Runners-up of the CEV Champions League in 1992 and 2002, twice Runners-up of the CEV Cup Winners' Cup in 1997 and 1998, third place in the world in the FIVB Volleyball Men's Club World Championship in 1992 and fourth place in the 1996 CEV European Super Cup) and one of the best supported volleyball teams in Europe.

In the 1992 CEV Champions League Final Four in Piraeus, an estimated 20,000 Olympiacos fans crowded the Peace and Friendship Stadium for the semi-final against CSKA Moscow and 20,000 more for the final against il Messaggero Ravenna. Volleyball legend Karch Kiraly, Hall of Famer and three times Olympic gold medalist, a key member of il Messaggero Ravenna at the time, talked about the 1992 CEV Champions League Final in a 2018 interview: "That particular CEV Champions League Final Four in Piraeus was really a very special experience. Even now as we speak, the first thing that comes to my mind was the unbelievable atmposhere that we all lived in that volleyball game in Athens 26 years ago. In that day I cherished the Greek supporters and the passion of Olympiacos fans for volleyball. It was something unique."

In the 1996 CEV Cup Winners' Cup Final Four which was held again in Piraeus and the Peace and Friendship Stadium, an estimated 18,000 to 20,000 Olympiacos fans filed into SEF and created the most intense atmosphere, pushing the team to their first ever European title against the German side Bayer Wuppertal, after a hard-fought 3–2 win. After the victory, hundreds of ecstatic Olympiacos fans stormed the court and celebrated the title with the players.

Olympiacos hosted the Final Four of the CEV Top Teams Cup in 2005 and Olympiacos supporters relived some of the 1990s moments. 15,000 fans packed the Peace and Friendship Stadium and provided once again an electric atmosphere, helping Olympiacos to win their second European title, after a 3–0 win against the Dutch side Ortec Nesselande Rotterdam in the final.

In 2018 Peace and Friendship Stadium lived once again some of its timeless glory, as an estimated 12,000 Olympiacos fans created an extraordinary atmosphere in the final of the 2017–18 CEV Challenge Cup against Bunge Ravenna. Ravenna's Austrian star Paul Buchegger talked about the atmosphere in the post-game interview: "The atmosphere, the fans were really great. It was a "red hell", when I entered the court I had goose bumps. I have never played in front of such a big crowd."

On 15 March 2023, 13,000 Olympiacos fans created an amazing atmosphere in a fully packed Peace and Frienship Stadium, as they helped Olympiacos win the 2022–23 CEV Challenge Cup, their third European title, after beating Maccabi Tel Aviv 3–0 in the second leg of the finals.

Notable players

 Michalis Alexandropoulos
 Kaloudis Alexoudis
 Sotiris Amarianakis
 Andreas Andreadis
 Christos Angelidis
 Apostolos Armenakis
 Theodoros Bozidis
 Akis Chatziantoniou
 Dimitris Chorianos
 Kostas Christofidelis
 Anestis Dalakouras
 Theologos Daridis
 Giorgos Dermatis
 Christos Dimitrakopoulos
 Iraklis Doriadis
 Giorgos Dragovits
- Mitar Đurić
 Giannis Fakas
- Dima Filippov
 Andreas Frangos
 Vasilis Galakos
 Marios Giourdas
 Dimitrios Gkaras
 Kostas Goudakos
- Konrad Guzda
 Makis Kanellos
 Theoklitos Karipidis
 Dimitris Kazazis
 Menelaos Kokkinakis
 Tasos Koublis
 Rafail Koumentakis
 Kostas Kourbetis
 Vasilis Kournetas
 Pavlos Kouzounis
 Chrysanthos Kyriazis
 Giannis Laios
 Dimosthenis Linardos
 Andreas Lorandos
 Giorgos Lykoudis
 Thanos Maroulis
 Thanasis Michalopoulos
 Avgoustinos Michalos
 Dimitris Mitropoulos
 Sakis Moustakidis
 Kyriakos Pantelias
 Achilleas Papadimitriou
 Giorgos Papazoglou
 Panagiotis Pelekoudas
 Giorgos Petreas
 Stefanos Polyzos
 Stelios Prosalikas
 Kostas Prousalis
 Giannis Roumeliotakis
 Nikos Roumeliotis
 Nikos Smaragdis
 Dimitris Soultanopoulos
 Giorgos Stefanou
 Kostas Stivachtis
 Giannis Takouridis
 Kostas Tambouratzis
 Lefteris Terzakis
 Andreas Theodoridis
 Michalis Triantafyllidis
 Antonis Tsakiropoulos
 Paraskevas Tselios
 Sotiris Tsergas
 Dimitris Tziavras
 Manos Xenakis
 Vasilis Xerovasilas
 Nikos Zoupanis
 Jorge Elgueta
 Pablo Meana
- Marcos Milinkovic
 Gustavo Bonatto
 Leonardo Caldeira
 Athos Ferreira Costa
 Paulino Dirceu
 Luiz Felipe Fonteles
 Todor Aleksiev
 Krasimir Gaydarski
 Ivaylo Gavrilov
 Nikolay Jeliazkov
 Plamen Konstantinov
 Lyudmil Naydenov
 Dimo Tonev
 Hristo Tsvetanov 
 Boyan Yordanov
 Andrey Zhekov
 Justin Duff
- Jason Haldane
 Gavin Schmitt
 Liberman Agámez
 Tomislav Čošković
 Rolando Despaigne
 Osvaldo Hernández
 Salvador Hidalgo Oliva
 Rodolfo Sánchez
 Janne Heikkinen
 Olli Kunnari
 Mikko Oivanen
 Eemi Tervaportti
 Renaud Herpe
 Marcus Böhme
 Christian Fromm
 Christian Pampel
 Simon Tischer
 Lorenzo Bernardi
 Paolo Merlo
 Dragan Travica
 Hermans Egleskalns
 Raimonds Vilde
 Božidar Ćuk
 Henk-Jan Held
 Wytze Kooistra
 Jeroen Rauwerdink
 Fabian Drzyzga
 Leszek Urbanowicz
 José Rivera
 Andrei Spînu
- Igor Runov
 Dejan Bojović
 Slobodan Boškan
 Dejan Brđović
 Konstantin Čupković
- Milan Jurišić
- Milan Marković
 Vasa Mijić
 Ivan Miljković
 Aleksandar Okolic
 Veljko Petković
- Goran Vujević
 František Ogurčák
 Alen Pajenk
 Tonček Štern
 Tine Urnaut
 Bengt Gustafson
 Andrii Diachkov
 Oleksiy Gatin
 Igor Popov
 Carson Clark
 Scott Fortune
 Tom Hoff
 Jayson Jablonsky
 Reid Priddy
 Riley Salmon
 Jeff Stork
 Donald Suxho
 Ernardo Gómez
 Iván Márquez
 Andy Rojas

Notable coaches

  Kostas Ampelas
  Kyriakos Pantelias
  Dimitar Zahariev
  Giannis Laios
  Vladimir Kondra
  Gian Paolo Montali
  Zoran Gajić
  Daniele Ricci
  Ljubomir Travica
  Claudio Cuello
  Anders Kristiansson
  Giannis Kalmazidis
  Dimitris Kazazis
  Roberto Piazza
  Slobodan Boškan
  Fernando Muñoz Benitez
  Alberto Giuliani

Season 2022–2023 squad

Notes 
1: Since February
2: Since January
3: Since January
4: Until February

Technical and managerial staff

Captains
 Michalis Triantafyllidis (1989–1994) 
 Sakis Moustakidis (1994–1996) 
 Giorgos Dragovits (1996–2001) 
 Marios Giourdas (2001–2003) 
 Antonis Tsakiropoulos (2003–2007) 
 Vasilis Kournetas (2007–2009) 
 Dimitris Soultanopoulos (2009–2010) 
 Andreas Andreadis (2010–2012) 
 Kostas Christofidelis (2012–2015)
 Menelaos Kokkinakis (2015–2017)
 Kostas Christofidelis (2017–2019)
 Giorgos Petreas (2019–2020)
 Kostas Stivachtis (2020–2022)
 Dragan Travica (2022–present)

Historical performance in Volleyleague

Stats

Positions

Kit manufacturer
The table below shows the history of kit providers for the Olympiacos team.

Sponsorship
Primary sponsors include: main sponsors like Porto Petrol other sponsors: Athens Medical Group, Nova Sports and Astari Plastikoy.

See also
 Olympiacos Women's Volleyball Team

References

External links

Olympiacos CFP Official Website – Men's Volleyball 

Volleyball
 
Greek volleyball clubs
Volleyball clubs established in 1926
1926 establishments in Greece